These are tables of congressional delegations from New York to the United States House of Representatives and the United States Senate.

The current dean of the New York delegation is Senator and Senate Majority Leader Chuck Schumer, having served in the Senate since 1999 and in Congress since 1981.

U.S. House of Representatives

Current members
This is a list of members of the current New York delegation in the U.S. House, along with their respective tenures in office, district boundaries, and district political ratings according to the CPVI. The delegation has a total of 26 members, including 15 Democrats and 11 Republicans.

1789–1793: 6 seats

1793–1803: 10 seats

1803–1813: 17 seats
From 1805 to 1809, the 2nd and 3rd districts jointly elected two representatives.

1813–1823: 27 seats

1823–1833: 34 seats

1833–1843: 40 seats

1843–1853: 34 seats

1853–1863: 33 seats

1863–1873: 31 seats

1873–1883: 33 seats

1883–1903: 34 seats

1903–1913: 37 seats
After the 1900 census, New York gained three seats.

1913–1933: 43 seats 
After the 1910 census, New York gained six seats.

1933–1953: 45 seats
During these two decades, New York had its maximum apportionment (to date) of 45 seats. From 1933 to 1945 there were 43 districts and two seats At-large. After 1945, there were 45 districts.

1953–1963: 43 seats
New York lost two seats following the 1950 census. It continued to lose seats from this point forward following every reapportionment.

1963–1973: 41 seats
New York lost two seats following the 1960 census.

1973–1983: 39 seats
New York lost two seats in the 1970 census.

1983–1993: 34 seats
New York lost five seats in the 1980 census.

1993–2003: 31 seats
New York lost three seats in the 1990 census.

2003–2013: 29 seats
New York lost two seats in the 2000 census.

2013–2023: 27 seats 
New York lost two seats in the 2010 census.

2023–present: 26 seats 
New York lost one seat in the 2020 census.

United States Senate

Key

See also

List of United States congressional districts
New York's congressional districts
Political party strength in New York

References 

 
 
Congressional delegations
Politics of New York (state)
New York